Los Angeles City Council District 12 is one of the 15 districts of the Los Angeles City Council.  It encompasses the northwestern and western section of the San Fernando Valley, in the city of Los Angeles. It is represented by John Lee.

On August 14, 2019 candidate John Lee claimed victory as the results showed him with a sizable lead over his opponent. Los Angeles City Council elections are nonpartisan. Lee is the only Independent on the 15-member council, his predecessors, Smith and Englander were Republicans.  With Lee, the City Council includes two Asian Americans (the other being Councilmember Nithya Raman), the most in its history. 



Politics

Geography

Modern

The district covers the northwestern San Fernando Valley communities of 
Chatsworth, 
Granada Hills 
Northridge
Porter Ranch
West Hills  
Sherwood Forest 
and parts of North Hills, and Reseda.

See official city map outlining District 12.

Historic

From 1925 to 1964 the district occupied the same general area in northwest Downtown Los Angeles or the Westlake area. In 1964, however, it was shifted bodily to the North Valley, taking Council Member John P. Cassidy with it.

The rough boundaries or descriptions have been as follows:

1926. Bunker Hill and northwest Downtown, with a district office at 1209 Huntley Drive in the Westlake area.<ref>[http://projects.latimes.com/mapping-la/neighborhoods/neighborhood/westlake/?q=1209+Huntley+Drive&lat=34.058644&lng=-118.257255&g=Google+Maps Location of the 12th District office in 1926 as shown on Mapping L.A.]</ref>

1928. South boundary: Ninth Street. West: Hoover Street. North: Fountain Avenue. East: Temple, Bellevue and Alvarado streets.

1932–33. Same as 1928, with the east boundary moved to Figueroa Street and the south boundary to Pico Boulevard."City Reapportionment Measure Gets Approval," Los Angeles Times, January 19, 1933 With map of all districts.

1935. Same general area as 1932, with the north boundary in an irregular line on Temple Boulevard to the southern edge of  Griffith Park.

1940. Same general area as previously, with the east and north boundaries at Glendale Boulevard and at Sunset Boulevard.

1954. West of Downtown, between  Figueroa and Catalina streets.

1955. Roughly Venice Boulevard on the south, Sunset Boulevard on the north, Catalina Street on the west and Figueroa Street on the east.

1964. Shifted to the northwest San Fernando Valley.

Officeholders

The district has been represented by thirteen men and one woman, Harriett Davenport; she succeeded her husband, Ed J. Davenport, who died in office in 1953.  The district has also been represented by a Republican since at least 1979.

Northwest and west of Downtown

San Fernando Valley

References

Access to the Los Angeles Times'' links requires the use of a library card.

External links
 official Los Angeles City Council District 12 website
 Council District 12: official city map

Los Angeles City Council districts
San Fernando Valley
Chatsworth, Los Angeles
Granada Hills, Los Angeles
Northridge, Los Angeles
Porter Ranch, Los Angeles
Reseda, Los Angeles
West Hills, Los Angeles
Santa Susana Mountains
Simi Hills